The 1948 Football Championship of UkrSSR were part of the 1948 Soviet republican football competitions in the Soviet Ukraine.

Qualification group stage

Group 1

Group 2

Group 3

Group 4 

Following clubs were supposed to play, but withdrew before start of the season Lokomotyv Izyum, Kharchovyk Kupiansk, Dynamo Kharkiv, Spartak Kharkiv, Kadiivka.

Group 5

Group 6

Group 7

Group 8

Group 9

Group 10

Final stage

Group 1

Group 2

Championship final
 FC Stal Kostiantynivka – FC Torpedo Odessa 0:2

References

External links
 1948. Football Championship of the UkrSSR (1948. Первенство УССР.) Luhansk Nash Futbol.
 Group 1: ukr-football.org.ua
 Group 2: ukr-football.org.ua
 Group 3: ukr-football.org.ua
 Group 4: ukr-football.org.ua
 Group 5: ukr-football.org.ua
 Group 6: ukr-football.org.ua
 Final: ukr-football.org.ua

Ukraine
Football Championship of the Ukrainian SSR
Championship